Wellesley Heights is a neighborhood in southwestern Lexington, Kentucky, United States. It is one of only three rural subdivisions in Fayette County - to protect farmland from development they are now illegal to build. Wellesley Heights is located on the southside of Versailles Road between New Circle Road and Man O War Boulevard. It is surrounded by farmland.

Neighborhood statistics
 Area: 
 Population: 38
 Population density: 280 people per square mile
 Median household income: $105,827

External links
 http://www.city-data.com/neighborhood/Wellesley-Heights-Lexington-KY.html

Neighborhoods in Lexington, Kentucky